Chukwudi is a Nigerian name. Notable people with the name include:

Given name
Chukwudi Chijindu (born 1986), American association football player
Chukwudi Chukwuma (born 1994), Nigerian football player 
Chukwudi Iwuji (born 1975), Nigerian-born British actor

Surname
Emmanuel Chukwudi Eze (1963–2007), Nigerian-born American philosopher
Ogonna Chukwudi (born 1988), Nigerian football midfielder